Linear low-density polyethylene (LLDPE) is a substantially linear polymer (polyethylene), with significant numbers of short branches, commonly made by copolymerization of ethylene with longer-chain olefins. Linear low-density polyethylene differs structurally from conventional low-density polyethylene (LDPE) because of the absence of long chain branching. The linearity of LLDPE results from the different manufacturing processes of LLDPE and LDPE. In general, LLDPE is produced at lower temperatures and pressures by copolymerization of ethylene and such higher alpha-olefins as butene, hexene, or octene. The copolymerization process produces an LLDPE polymer that has a narrower molecular weight distribution than conventional LDPE and in combination with the linear structure, significantly different rheological properties.

Production and properties 
The production of LLDPE is initiated by transition metal catalysts, particularly Ziegler or Philips types of catalyst. The actual polymerization process can be done either in solution phase or in gas phase reactors. Usually, octene is the comonomer in solution phase while butene and hexene are copolymerized with ethylene in a gas phase reactor. LLDPE has higher tensile strength and higher impact and puncture resistance than does LDPE. It is very flexible and elongates under stress. It can be used to make thinner films, with better environmental stress cracking resistance. It has good resistance to chemicals. It has good electrical properties. However, it is not as easy to process as LDPE, has lower gloss, and narrower range for heat sealing.

Processing 
LDPE and LLDPE have unique rheological or melt flow properties. LLDPE is less shear sensitive because of its narrower molecular weight distribution and shorter chain branching. During a shearing process, such as extrusion, LLDPE remains more viscous and, therefore, harder to process than an LDPE of equivalent melt index. The lower shear sensitivity of LLDPE allows for a faster stress relaxation of the polymer chains during extrusion, and, therefore, the physical properties are susceptible to changes in blow-up ratios. In melt extension, LLDPE has lower viscosity at all strain rates. This means it will not strain harden the way LDPE does when elongated. As the deformation rate of the polyethylene increases, LDPE demonstrates a dramatic rise in viscosity because of chain entanglement. This phenomenon is not observed with LLDPE because of the lack of long-chain branching in LLDPE allows the chains to slide by one another upon elongation without becoming entangled. This characteristic is important for film applications because LLDPE films can be downgauged easily while maintaining high strength and toughness. The rheological properties of LLDPE are summarized as "stiff in shear" and "soft in extension". LLDPE can be recycled though into other things like trash can liners, lumber, landscaping ties, floor tiles, compost bins, and shipping envelopes

Application 
LLDPE has penetrated almost all traditional markets for polyethylene; it is used for plastic bags and sheets (where it allows using lower thickness than comparable LDPE), plastic wrap, stretch wrap, pouches, toys, covers, lids, pipes, buckets and containers, covering of cables, geomembranes, and mainly flexible tubing. In 2013, the world market for LLDPE reached a volume of $40 billion.

LLDPE manufactured by using metallocene catalysts is labeled mLLDPE.

See also 
 Cross-linked polyethylene (XLPE/PEX)
 Low-density polyethylene (LDPE)
 High-density polyethylene (HDPE)
 Medium-density polyethylene (MDPE)
 Ultra-high-molecular-weight polyethylene (UHMWPE)
 Stretch wrap
 Plastic recycling

References 

Modern Plastic Mid-October Encyclopedia Issue, page 56 and 61

External links

 Example of LLDPE Physical Properties

Polyolefins
Plastics
Packaging materials